The 1901 All-Ireland Senior Football Championship was the 15th staging of Ireland's premier Gaelic football knock-out competition. The Munster semi-final Cork ended Tipperary's day as All Ireland champions. Dublin were the winners.

Format
The four provincial championships are played as usual. The four champions play in the "Home" championship, with the winners of the Home final going on to face London in the All-Ireland final.

Results

Connacht Senior Football Championship

Leinster Senior Football Championship     

An objection was made and a replay ordered.

Munster Senior Football Championship    

Match abandoned due to an illness to the referee

Ulster Senior Football Championship

All-Ireland Senior Football Championship

Championship statistics

Miscellaneous
 Mayo win their first Connacht title.

References

All-Ireland Senior Football Championship